The Masonic Temple is a historic Masonic Lodge building located at Parkersburg, Wood County, West Virginia. It was built in 1915, and is a three-story, three-bay wide, red brick building with stone trim in the Classical Revival style.  It features elliptical bays flanking the central bay on the front facade. The building was designed by Columbus architect Frank Packard with local supervising architect Theodore T. Sansbury.

It was listed on the National Register of Historic Places in 1982, and it is a contributing property to the Avery Street Historic District, which was designated and listed on the National Register in 1986.

References

Masonic buildings completed in 1915
Neoclassical architecture in West Virginia
Clubhouses on the National Register of Historic Places in West Virginia
Frank Packard buildings
Masonic buildings in West Virginia
Buildings and structures in Parkersburg, West Virginia
National Register of Historic Places in Wood County, West Virginia
Individually listed contributing properties to historic districts on the National Register in West Virginia
1915 establishments in West Virginia